White Lake is a town in Bladen County, North Carolina, United States. The population was 802 at the 2010 census, up from 529 in 2000.

Geography
White Lake is located at  (34.632215, -78.498148).

Demographics

At the 2000 census there were 529 people, 238 households, and 149 families in the town. The population density was 593.1 people per square mile (229.5/km). There were 1,060 housing units at an average density of 1,188.5 per square mile (459.9/km).  The racial makeup of the town was 92.25% White, 3.59% African American, 0.57% Asian, 3.01% from other races, and 0.57% from two or more races. Hispanic or Latino of any race were 3.40%.

Of the 238 households 23.9% had children under the age of 18 living with them, 50.4% were married couples living together, 9.7% had a female householder with no husband present, and 37.0% were non-families. 32.8% of households were one person and 10.9% were one person aged 65 or older. The average household size was 2.22 and the average family size was 2.83.

The age distribution was 20.8% under the age of 18, 7.0% from 18 to 24, 27.6% from 25 to 44, 30.8% from 45 to 64, and 13.8% 65 or older. The median age was 42 years. For every 100 females, there were 94.5 males. For every 100 females age 18 and over, there were 91.3 males.

The median household income was $35,375 and the median family income  was $45,625. Males had a median income of $36,875 versus $25,000 for females. The per capita income for the town was $22,446. About 9.9% of families and 14.2% of the population were below the poverty line, including 30.4% of those under age 18 and 11.0% of those age 65 or over.

References

External links
 Town of White Lake official website
 Elizabethtown-White Lake Area Chamber of Commerce

Towns in Bladen County, North Carolina
Towns in North Carolina
Beaches of North Carolina